Hickstead may refer to:

 All England Jumping Course at Hickstead, a show jumping venue in England
 Hickstead (horse), an Olympic gold medal winning show jumping horse
 Hickstead, a hamlet in Twineham civil parish, in the Mid Sussex District of West Sussex, England.